Post Brothers is a nationally recognized leader in multifamily development, innovation, and sustainability. Since the company’s founding in Philadelphia in 2006, it has developed or acquired more than 30 properties, and upon completion of its current $1.3 billion owned development pipeline will have developed over 7,000 apartment units with a current portfolio exceeding $1.6 billion. Post Brothers properties to date have all thrived due to a common theme: making a level of upscale, world-class living accessible at a price point that was not previously available. 
Post Brothers is responsible for many ground-up and adaptive reuse projects, with a more recent focus on newer development. Adaptive reuse projects include the restoration and development of the historic Goldtex building in downtown Philadelphia, the renovation of Rittenhouse Hill, a 624-unit project in East Falls, Presidential City, a $200-million redevelopment of the historic 1,000-unit complex on City Avenue, The Atlantic, now considered the crown jewel of Center City Philadelphia and the Avenue of the Arts, The Poplar, a 285 unit apartment redeveloped from a former Strawbridge’s & Clothier warehouse in 2021. Newer ground-up projects include Piazza Alta, an 1,131 unit collection of residences that serve as an expansion to the original Piazza in the center of Northern Liberties and Broad & Washington, a 1,457 unit development that is expected to be the largest development outside of New York in nearly 50 years.

History
Founded by brothers Matthew and Michael Pestronk in 2006, Post Brothers is a vertically integrated residential real estate development company.

In November 2011, Post Brothers began work on the rehabilitation of an existing building, known as Rittenhouse Hill, in Germantown, Philadelphia, which would eventually contain 624 housing units, including a mixture of studios, one-bedroom and two-bedroom apartments and over 30,000 square feet in retail space.[3] Multimillion-dollar renovations were completed in July, 2013.The build is highlighted by many Green building features, including energy efficient lighting and a heating and air conditioning system utilizing a high efficiency electric heat pump.[4] The building is completely powered by wind-generated power and became the first building in Philadelphia of this size to use wind energy as the sole source of energy.

In 2012, Post Brothers announced that they would commence with the refurbishment of the Goldtex building, at an estimated cost of $40 million. When completed, the building would be home to approximately 160 loft-style apartments, ranging from studios to three-bedrooms; and 7,000 square feet of retail space. In January 2016, Goldtex received Philadelphia's first LEED Gold-level certification for a residential high-rise with Green building features such as 100% wind-generated power, Energy Star rated appliances, highly-efficient heating and air conditioning system balancing demand throughout the building.

In 2012, Post Brothers purchased a historic four-building, known as the Presidential City Apartments. After renovations are complete the complex will feature 1038 apartments, approximately 8,000 square feet of retail and an outdoor lounge and pool area.

Presidential City was a preview of what was down the road. The property became a mini-neighborhood in its own rite upon its redevelopment, with luxury apartment living accessible to all: from students to growing families and young professionals to older adults. Presidential City brought a more universally suitable residential option for those who enjoy city and suburban life.
The Duchess is a ground-up development project on the Northern New Jersey Gold Coast that has defined the market for upscale finishes and amenities. The project consists of 320 Class-A apartments across three 12-story towers and an amenity package that is unrivaled in the market. Post completed construction of the property in Q4 2018.
Post Brothers purchased a 320,000 square foot, partially vacant office building on 260 South Broad Street in Philadelphia, in the Avenue of the Arts for over $27 million in July 2012. Post Brothers completed development of The Atlantic  in 2019, brought fresh elegance and state-of-the-art amenities to Philadelphia, with an overall design that’s remarkably sleek, elegant and bright. It’s named after the Atlantic-Richfield Oil company, which was originally headquartered in the Joseph F. Kuntz-designed building back in 1922.

The Poplar, which completed development in West Poplar, adjacent to Northern Liberties and Center City in early 2021. The property has been redeveloped as 285 Class-A apartments, 50k SF of move-in ready, pre-built office space, adjacent parking, and an expansive rooftop amenity package.

Newer ground-up projects include Piazza Alta, an 1,131 unit collection of residences that serve as an expansion to the original Piazza in the center of Northern Liberties, a development previously purchased and renovated by Post Brothers. The Piazza is a mixed-use development meant to meld with the trendy and upscale community, distinguishing itself from traditional Center City. The project is the largest development set for completion in 2022. It is the first large-scale project to leverage the use of pre-fabricated bearing wall technology to create a Class-A product at less than 20% of the cost of more traditional construction methods.

Broad & Washington, a 1,457 unit development that is expected to be the largest development outside of New York in nearly 50 years. In partnership with Tower Investments, Post Brothers will develop the site, which sat fallow for 40 years, to become a transformative project for the neighborhood that will serve as a worthy gateway to Center City. Work on the multi-family community has already begun, with the first stages of construction beginning in December 2021. The first phase of the project is expected to be completed by 2024, and the entire community by 2026.

Other Notable Projects
Post Brothers has been responsible for a number of other notable building projects throughout Philadelphia including Hamilton Court, which was a comprehensive renovation of all units within this 105-unit, 304-bed student housing complex in 2018 in University City.

Accolades
Post Brothers have won numerous awards over the years for their category-killer developments, company culture and stand-out employees including the Philadelphia Business Journal Faces of Philanthropy Award in 2021, Preservation Alliance Economic Impact Award for The Atlantic in 2021, ABC Eastern PA 2021 Excellence in Construction Award for The Cove at The Piazza, Philadelphia Business Journal 2020 Best Real Estate Deals of the Year for The Poplar,  and more.

References

Housing organizations in the United States